is a female Japanese manga artist.

Profile
She is currently living in Tokyo, but she was born in Ota, Tokyo.

Works

Manga
, published in Manga Time from 2003 to 2004.
Note: She published the manga under the name .
Volume 1: 
Volume 2: 
 
 

Published by Shogakukan and is serialized in Sunday GX from February 2004 till January 2006 with a total of 4 volumes.
Volume 1: 
Volume 2: 
Volume 3: 
Volume 4:

Artbooks

Published in March 2007.

References

External links
  

1979 births
Living people
People from Ōta, Tokyo
Women manga artists
Manga artists from Tokyo
Japanese female comics artists
Female comics writers
21st-century Japanese women writers